Schurman is a surname. Notable people with the surname include:

 Anna Maria van Schurman (1607–1678), Dutch poet and scholar
 Jacob Gould Schurman (1854–1942), American educationist

See also
 Schuurman, Dutch surname
 Schürmann, German surname
 Shurman, a rock band from Los Angeles, California, USA
 Sherman (surname)